Tomáš Hrdlička (born 17 February 1982) is a Czech football defender who recently played as a defender for the Corgoň Liga club Slovan Bratislava. He spent most of his teenage years playing in the Slavia Prague youth setup making his senior debut aged twenty. He moved to FK Mladá Boleslav in 2007 on a free transfer.

He has also represented the Czech Republic internationally at the under-21s level, winning a gold medal with the U21 team in the 2002 European championship.

References

External links
 
 

Czech footballers
Czech Republic youth international footballers
Czech Republic under-21 international footballers
Czech First League players
SK Slavia Prague players
1982 births
Living people
FK Mladá Boleslav players
ŠK Slovan Bratislava players
Slovak Super Liga players
Czech expatriate sportspeople in Slovakia
Expatriate footballers in Slovakia
Association football midfielders
Footballers from Prague